Davor Lamešić (born October 24, 1983) is a Bosnian-Austrian professional basketball player for WBC Raiffeisen Wels since 2008. Lamesic has also often played for the Austrian national basketball team.

He started his career with Arkadia Traiskirchen Lions in 2004, in 2008 he played for BG Göttingen in Germany and then moved back to Austria to play for WBC Raiffeisen Wels.

Honours
Austrian Championship (1): 2009
ABL Austrian MVP (3): 2006, 2008, 2017
ABL All-Star (4): 2003, 2006, 2007, 2008

References

External links

Profile at eurobasket.com
Agency profile

1983 births
Living people
Austrian men's basketball players
Austrian people of Bosnia and Herzegovina descent
Austrian people of Croatian descent
BG Göttingen players
Bosnia and Herzegovina men's basketball players
Croats of Bosnia and Herzegovina
Naturalised citizens of Austria
Flyers Wels players
Power forwards (basketball)
Traiskirchen Lions players